Boffo may refer to:

People
 Francesco Boffo (1796–1867), Sardinian architect responsible for many buildings in southern Russia and Ukraine
 Dino Boffo (born 1952), Italian journalist
 Adolfo Bautista (born 1979), Mexican midfielder nicknamed "Bofo"

Fiction
 Mister Boffo, a comic strip created by Joe Martin
 Phineas Boffo, a character in the TV series Carnivàle
 Boffo, a psychological trick employed by the witch Eumenides Treason in Terry Pratchett's Discworld series

Other
 BOFFO, a nonprofit arts organization in Fire Island Pines, New York
 Boffo Games, a video game developer